Maria Filomena de Fátima Lobão Telo Delgado is the Angolan Ambassador to South Africa.

Career 
Maria Filomena de Fátima Lobão Telo Delgado was born in Huambo and attended the Sarmento Rodrigues Industrial and Commercial School there.  Delgado attended the  University of Calabar in Nigeria where she was awarded a degree in sociology.  She is a member of the MPLA and its women's affiliate the Organization of Angolan Women (OMA).  Delgado held many positions with OMA including deputy regional secretary for southern Africa; head of the office for studies and projects and director of the general secretariat.  She remains a member of OMA National Committee and the Discipline and Audit Committee as well as its Coordinator for Bengo Province.

Delgado was a member of Angola's Rural Women's Committee and on the board of directors of the African Humanitarian Association.  She is also a member of the MPLA committee of psychologists and sociologists.

Delgado was a deputy minister in the Cabinet of Angola Ministry for Family and the Promotion of Women before she transferred to the Ministry of Agriculture and Rural Development in the same role.  She was promoted to Secretary of State in October 2008.  Since at least March 2016 she had returned to the  Ministry for Family and the Promotion of Women as Secretary of State.

References 

Year of birth missing (living people)
Living people
MPLA politicians
Family and Gender Promotion ministers of Angola
Women government ministers of Angola
University of Calabar alumni
Women's ministers
Agriculture ministers
21st-century Angolan women politicians
21st-century Angolan politicians